The Olympics are an American doo-wop group, formed in 1957 by lead singer Walter Ward (August 28, 1940 – December 11, 2006). The group also included Eddie Lewis (tenor, Ward's cousin), Charles Fizer (tenor), Walter Hammond (baritone), and Melvin King (bass). With the exception of Lewis, all were friends in a Los Angeles, California, high school.

History and influence
Their first record was credited to Walter Ward and the Challengers ("I Can Tell" on Melatone Records). After the name change, they recorded "Western Movies" (Demon Records) in the summer of 1958. Co-written by Fred Smith and Cliff Goldsmith, "Western Movies" made it to No. 8 on the Billboard Hot 100 chart. The song reflected the nation's preoccupation with western themed movies and television programs. It told the story of a man who lost his girl to TV westerns, and it included doo-wop harmonies as well as background gunshots and ricochet sound effects.

In 1959, the group recorded "(Baby) Hully Gully" (Arvee Records), which initiated the Hully Gully dance craze. "Big Boy Pete," which the group released in 1960, served as inspiration for The Kingsmen's "The Jolly Green Giant". Over the next ten years The Olympics recorded upbeat R&B songs, often about dances popular at the time.

In 1965, The Olympics were one of the first to record "Good Lovin'", penned by Rudy Clark and Arthur Resnick.
In 1966, The Young Rascals version rose to No. 1 on the US Hot 100. Since then, many recorded versions have been made by prominent artists, including Mary Wells, The Ventures, The Who, The Grateful Dead, Bobby McFerrin and The Bobs.

Fizer was shot and killed during the Watts riots in 1965. Shortly thereafter, King left the group after his sister died in an accidental shooting. A revamped group continued to record into the early 1970s but were unable to attain popular chart success after the mid 1960s. The Olympics continued to perform on the oldies circuit in the United States and other countries.

In 1984, Rhino Records issued an album titled The Official Record Album of The Olympics, containing recordings from the group from the 1950s and 1960s.  The Los Angeles Olympic Organizing Committee sued Rhino, claiming that Rhino's record could be confused with the album The Official Music of the XXIII Olympiad—Los Angeles 1984.  Rhino won the lawsuit.

Walter Ward's song "Well (Baby Please Don't Go)" (the B-side to "Western Movies") was recorded twice by John Lennon in 1971: the February 1971 studio recording was not issued until the 1998 John Lennon Anthology, then again on Wonsaponatime. A June 1971 live recording with Frank Zappa and the Mothers of Invention was issued on 1972's Some Time in New York City, and on Zappa's 1992's Playground Psychotics.

Eddie Lewis, tenor singer and last original member of the Olympics, died on May 31, 2017. Current and remaining members of The Olympics are Vel Omarr, Alphonso Boyd, and Samuel E. Caesar.

Discography

Albums
Doin' the Hully Gully (1960) Arvee A-423
Dance by the Light of the Moon (1961) Arvee A-424
Party Time (1961) Arvee A-429
Do the Bounce (1963) Tri-Disc 1001
Something Old, Something New (1966) Mirwood
The Official Record Album of The Olympics (1984) Rhino 207

Singles

References

External links
Olympics Interview
Music Web
The Olympics
Walter Ward's obituary in the Los Angeles Times
Lyrics Freak

African-American musical groups
American rhythm and blues musical groups
American vocal groups
Doo-wop groups
Jay Boy artists
Loma Records artists
MGM Records artists
Mirwood Records artists
Musical groups established in 1957
Musical groups from Los Angeles